"Dog on a Leash" is a song from the American hard rock band Adelitas Way, released on April 8, 2014. It is the first single from their third studio album, Stuck and reached No. 7 on the U.S. Active Rock chart.

Song meaning

Rick DeJesus explains the track is about "feeling like you need to ask permission to do what you want, like you're under the mercy of someone else, whether it's your boss or an overbearing girlfriend or boyfriend or whoever."

Release
A teaser trailer was released on March 18, 2014. An audio video of song was released on April 9, 2014. The music video was released on April 29, 2014.

Music video
The video (Directed by Agata Alexander) features Adelitas Way performing in a remote deserted area near a lake, when a mysterious woman appears from the depths. Frontman Rick DeJesus and the band perform the track with unbridled energy until DeJesus himself is ensnared by her beauty as she literally yanks his chain.

Track listing

References 

2014 songs
2014 singles
Adelitas Way songs
Virgin Records singles
Songs written by Rick DeJesus